Adam John Hollioake (born 5 September 1971) is a professional athlete who is the only international cricketer to compete professionally as a Mixed Martial Artist. He has also competed as a professional boxer. However he is most well known as a cricketing all-rounder who played for Surrey and England. He captained Surrey from 1997 until 2003, winning three County Championships, and led the England cricket team in One Day Internationals. He was named one of the Wisden Cricketers of the Year in 2003.

Since retiring from cricket in 2004, Hollioake has spent his time involved in charitable and media work as well as owning a property development business. He moved to Perth, Western Australia and later to Queensland. His property company, the Hollioake Group, collapsed in 2010. As of 2018, he works as a cricket coach in Afghanistan and for the England Lions.

Early life
Hollioake was born in Melbourne in 1971 and grew up in the mining town of Ballarat, where his family had lived for five generations. His father, an engineer, had played cricket for local sides, but Hollioake showed a preference for Australian Rules Football while attending St Patrick's College, Ballarat. The family moved to England in 1983 for 2 years where Hollioake attended St George's College in Weybridge. He would then move to Hong Kong for 3 years where he honed his cricketing skills and then back to Australia where he attended Wesley College where brother Ben would later study.

Cricketing career
Although born in Australia, both Adam and brother Ben learned their cricket at the Hong Kong Cricket Club Junior Gappers during the time their father John was working in Hong Kong and at wesley College in Perth. Hollioake was offered a contract by Surrey in 1989 and made his first-class debut for the county in August 1993. He was awarded his county cap in 1995, during a season in which he scored 1099 runs and took 21 wickets. He was described as an all-rounder with "aggressive batting and inventive medium-pace allsorts" and began to share captaincy duties for Surrey with Alec Stewart in 1996. He captained Surrey from 1997 until 2003, and led them to victory in the County Championship in 1999, 2000 and 2002. He went on to claim 9 trophies in his time as Surrey captain making him one of the most successful 1st class captains of all time.

Hollioake made his England debut in two One Day International matches against Pakistan in August 1996. He led the England A team on their tour of Australia in 1996–97 and was man of the series in the home One Day International series against Australia in May 1997, scoring the winning runs in all three games. He made his test debut, playing alongside his brother Ben, against Australia in August 1997, scoring 45 runs in the first innings and taking two wickets.

Although his test career lasted only four matches in 1997 and at the beginning of 1998, Hollioake achieved greater success in One Day Internationals, playing in 35 matches from 1996 to 1999. He captained the side to victory in the 1997 Sharjah Cup, England's first tournament success for ten years. Injuries and a loss of form saw him lose the captaincy after 14 matches.

After 173 first-classes matches for Surrey, Hollioake retired from cricket at the end of the 2004 season. He made an appearance in the 2005 Asian tsunami appeal charity match, taking a hat-trick, and made a brief return to Twenty20 cricket in 2007, playing in eight matches for Essex.

Charity work
Following the death of his brother and Surrey and England teammate, Ben, in a car accident in 2002, Hollioake and his family established the Ben Hollioake Fund to raise funds for CHASE hospice care for children. In 2003 he undertook 'The Journey', walking from Edinburgh, then sailing the English channel from Brighton to Dieppe, riding from Dieppe to Gibraltar and finally rowing from Gibraltar to Tangiers. The journey took over 2 months and raised several hundred thousand pounds for the Chase Charity.

In 2004 Hollioake's charity broke the world record for the number of participants in a continuous 100-metre relay. Other fundraising projects Hollioake has been involved in include Cricket Challenge, which raises money for the Queensland-based charity Paradise Kids, where members of the public compete against stars and cricketing legends, and the Battle of the Stars charity golf day.

Media work
Hollioake made several appearances on the BBC programme A Question of Sport and Sky Sports Cricket AM, as well as appearing on programmes such as the 2004 Test the Nation quiz. He worked for Sky again in their coverage of the Ashes in 2010. In 2005 Hollioake took part in a revived Superstars programme on BBC television, finishing fourth in the competition behind skier Alain Baxter, Olympic athlete Du'aine Ladejo and rower Steve Williams. In 2007 Hollioake and Ladejo formed Quiet Storm Productions, which owned the television show Australia's Greatest Athlete.

Business career
Hollioake and other members of his family owned an Australia-based property company, the Hollioake Group, which collapsed with debts of around A$20 million and was liquidated in September 2010. Following a long-running legal case, during which Hollioake and his father were sued by businessman Martin Ryman, Hollioake was declared bankrupt in 2011.

Coaching career
Hollioake coached the Hong Kong national cricket team at the 2000 ACC Trophy.

As of 2018, Hollioake coaches Afghan Twenty20 cricket team Boost Defenders, who play in the Shpageeza Cricket League. He is also a fielding coach for the England Lions.

Boxing career

In April 2012, he revealed that he would be starting a new career as a mixed martial artist in Queensland, Australia in the light heavyweight division. Having already fought once as a boxer – knocking his opponent out in the fourth round – Hollioake made his MMA debut in the Days of Glory promotion on 5 May 2012. The fight was resulted in a majority draw (with one judge favouring Hollioake), with Hollioake undecided about whether he would continue his MMA career in the future.

On 1 September 2012, Hollioake defeated Warren Tresidder in the modified style of MMA which will eliminate the use of knee strikes, elbows strikes and kicks but allows limited ground fighting.

MMA record

|-
|Draw
|align=center|0–0–1
|Joel Millar
|Draw (Majority)
|Glory 2 – The Struggle Within
|
|align=center|3
|align=center|5:00
|	
|

References

Further reading

External links
 Official Adam Hollioake Website
 

1971 births
Living people
Australian people of Indonesian descent
Cricketers at the 1999 Cricket World Cup
England One Day International cricketers
England Test cricketers
English cricketers
English cricket captains
Essex cricketers
People educated at St George's College, Weybridge
Sportspeople from Melbourne
Surrey cricketers
Surrey cricket captains
Wisden Cricketers of the Year
Test and County Cricket Board XI cricketers
Coaches of the Hong Kong national cricket team